Desislava Balabanova (born November 25, 1988 in Sofia) is a Bulgarian sport shooter. Balabanova represented Bulgaria at the 2008 Summer Olympics in Beijing, where she competed in two rifle shooting events. She placed twenty-sixth out of forty-seven shooters in the women's 10 m air rifle, with a total score of 393 points. Nearly a week later, Balabanova competed for her second event, 50 m rifle 3 positions, where she was able to shoot 192 targets in a kneeling position, and 191 each in prone and in standing, for a total score of 574 points, finishing only in twenty-eighth place.

References

External links
ISSF Profile
NBC Olympics Profile

Bulgarian female sport shooters
Living people
Olympic shooters of Bulgaria
Shooters at the 2008 Summer Olympics
Sportspeople from Sofia
1988 births
21st-century Bulgarian women